Eric Neilson (born August 18, 1984) is a Canadian  former professional ice hockey player who was known as an enforcer. He last played with the Manchester Storm of the Elite Ice Hockey League (EIHL). Neilson was selected by the Los Angeles Kings in the 5th round (143rd overall) of the 2004 NHL Entry Draft.

Playing career
On July 13, 2011, Neilson was signed as a free agent by the Norfolk Admirals to a one-year AHL Standard Player's Contract. After appearing in 47 games for the Calder Cup record-setting Admirals, Neilson followed the team affiliation with the Tampa Bay Lightning and signed with the Syracuse Crunch on July 5, 2012.
Neilson played 3 season with the Crunch, from 2012–13 to 2014–15.

It was announced in May 2016 that Neilson would move away from the US and join UK side the Manchester Storm playing in the EIHL - the UK's highest level of professional ice hockey.

Career statistics

References

External links

1984 births
Alaska Aces (ECHL) players
Bakersfield Condors (1998–2015) players
Canadian ice hockey right wingers
Hamilton Bulldogs (AHL) players
Ice hockey people from New Brunswick
Living people
Long Beach Ice Dogs (ECHL) players
Los Angeles Kings draft picks
Manchester Storm (2015–) players
Missouri Mavericks players
Norfolk Admirals players
Peoria Rivermen (AHL) players
Rimouski Océanic players
St. John's IceCaps players
San Antonio Rampage players
Sportspeople from Fredericton
Syracuse Crunch players
Canadian expatriate ice hockey players in England